Agency for Medicinal Products and Medical Devices of the Republic of Slovenia (acronym: JAZMP) is a regulatory agency of the Republic of Slovenia competent for medicinal products and medical devices. It was created on 1 January 2007 through the merger of the Agency for Medicinal Products and Medical Devices and the Institute for Pharmacy and Testing of Medicinal Products – Ljubljana, and as the new entity took over all the rights and obligations of both its predecessors. It is an independent regulatory body competent for medicinal products and medical devices in the fields of human medicine and veterinary medicine, its purpose being protection of public health in the fields of medicinal products and medical devices.

See also
 Formularium Slovenicum

References

External links
 

Medical and health organizations based in Slovenia
Organizations established in 2007
Pharmacy in Slovenia
National agencies for drug regulation
Regulation of medical devices